Eric Champion (born May 12, 1970) is one of the pioneers of mid 1990s Christian pop and modern rock.  In the beginning of his musical career, he was a pop singer. His music had the flair of many of his Christian pop contemporaries but with more of a Michael Jackson meets Prince vocal approach meets futuristic techno dance sounds. Although his first album was released when he was only 18 years old, one of Eric's biggest albums during his pop phase was Vertical Reality which went on to sell nearly 100,000 units.

Eric also is noted for songwriting with various artists including Rebecca St. James and Plumb.

In 1998, Champion was featured at the Atlanta Fest Christian music festival.

After the release of his eighth album Natural (his second for Brentwood Essential), Eric left the Nashville scene and moved with his new wife and child to Orlando, FL where he started working at the recording college Full Sail University.

In 2005, Eric reappeared with two new projects, a new solo EP, Unexpected and a Brit pop rock project, Rook which also included former GS Megaphone drummer Randall Shreve.

Discography

 Rook -Bad Memory EP, 2005
 Unexpected EP, 2005
 The Greatest Hits of Eric Champion, 2000
 Natural, 1998
 Transformation, 1996
 Lover's Heart (Soft Hits), 1995
 Vertical Reality, 1994
 The B/W Project, 1993 (Along with Rodney "T" Thomas) Released through Warner Alliance.
 Save The World, 1992
 Hot Christmas, 1992
 Revolution Time, 1991
 Eric Champion, 1990

References

External links
 

1970 births
American pop rock musicians
American male singer-songwriters
American rock songwriters
American rock singers
Living people
American performers of Christian music
Musicians from Daytona Beach, Florida
Singer-songwriters from Florida
21st-century American singers
21st-century American male singers